Marginella rubrocincta is a species of sea snail, a marine gastropod mollusk in the family Marginellidae, the margin snails.

Description

Distribution
This marine species occurs off Port Alfred, South Africa.

References

 Turton, W. H. (1932) Marine Shells of Port Alfred, S. Africa. Humphrey Milford, London, xvi + 331 pp., 70 pls. page(s): 37

Marginellidae
Gastropods described in 1932